The Best is the first greatest hits album by Australian singer-songwriter, James Reyne. The album peaked at number 16 on the ARIA Charts.
It includes the track "Way Out West" with James Blundell which peaked at number 2 in April 1992.

Track listing
 CD/ Cassette (Virgin/ EMI/ Capitol Records – 7807582)
 "Fall of Rome" - 4:57
 "Hammerhead" - 4:46
 "Rip it Up" - 5:42
 "Motor's Too Fast" - 4:20
 "Outback Woman" - 3:38
 "One More River" - 4:01
 "Stood Up" - 4:54
 "Slave" - 4:13
 "Any Day Above Ground" - 3:38
 "Some People" - 4:14
 "Wake Up Deadman" - 3:43
 "Way Out West" (with James Blundell)  - 3:59
 "Reckless" - 5:19
 "Heaven on a Stick" - 3:24
 "Always the Way"	- 7:23

tracks 1–4, 14-15 taken from the album James Reyne
tracks 6, 11 taken from the album Hard Reyne
tracks 5, 7-10, 13  taken from the album Electric Digger Dandy

Charts

Weekly charts

Year-end charts

Certifications

References

James Reyne albums
Compilation albums by Australian artists
1992 compilation albums